Ropica batchianensis is a species of beetle in the family Cerambycidae. It was described by Breuning in 1973.

References

batchianensis
Beetles described in 1973